John Hale may refer to:

Blessed John Haile (died 1535), English priest and martyr, also known as John Hale
John Hale (Roundhead) (1614–1691), English politician
John Hale (minister) (1636–1700), American Puritan minister
John Hale (British Army officer) (1728–1806), British general
John Hale (Canadian politician) (1765–1838), member of the Legislative Council of Lower Canada
John P. Hale (1806–1873), United States Representative and Senator from New Hampshire
John K. Hale (New York politician) (1807–1879), American politician, member of the New York State Assembly and New York State Senate 
John Hale (cricketer) (1830–1878), English cricketer
John Blackwell Hale (1831–1905), United States Representative from Missouri
Johnny Hale (died 1881), American rancher and cattle rustler
John K. Hale (Iowa politician) (1858–1946), American politician, member of the Iowa House of Representatives and Iowa Senate 
John Henry Hale (1878–1944), American surgeon
John Rigby Hale (1923–1999), English historian of the Renaissance
John R. Hale (archaeologist) (born 1951), American archaeologist and historian of Athens
John Hale (baseball) (born 1953), American baseball player

See also
John Hales (disambiguation)
Jack Hale (disambiguation) 
Jonathan Hale (1891–1966), Canadian/American actor